The Togg T10X is a luxury fully electric C-segment SUV produced by the Turkish car manufacturer Togg, Türkiye'nin Otomobili Girişim Grubu (Turkey's Automobile Joint Venture Group). Togg started manufacturing the T10X from October 2022, which is the first model of five electric cars that are planned to be produced by 2030. Pre-sales started in March 2023, with delivery slated for July 2023.

Presentation 
The T10X is presented by the Turkish car manufacturer Togg on December 27, 2019 during a public event in Bilişim Vadisi (Silicon Valley of Turkey) in the province of Kocaeli, where the prototype of a compact sedan (C-Sedan) is also presented in the same event. Production of the T10X began on October 29, 2022, the day of the inauguration of the Gemlik plant, where the first Togg vehicle, an Anadolu red T10X comes assembled from the assembly line. The sale of the T10X started in March 2023 in Turkey and it will be available in the European market towards the end of 2024.

The Togg T10X is in direct competition with other premium compact SUVs such as the Audi Q4 e-tron, the Mercedes-Benz EQB, the Volvo XC40 Recharge or the BMW iX3.

History

The automotive industry in Turkey has previously produced cars domestically, for example the first ever Turkish car manufacturer Devrim and also the Anadol brand.

Togg that stands for Türkiye'nin Otomobili Girişim Grubu (Turkey's Automobile Joint Venture Group Inc.) was founded as a joint venture by 5 Turkish companies in 2018.

Naming 
The T10X has a designation that corresponds to a "code" at Togg:

 The "T" refers to Turkey, the vehicle's country of origin, and Togg;
 The "10" stands for compact segment (C);
 The "X" designates the SUV body type.

Overview
The vehicle was designed by Italian firm Pininfarina, with a contribution from Turkish designer Murat Günak, based on TOGG's requirements, including a tulip motif. There is a "western" and an "oriental" variant.

Platform
The platform will be shared across all five cars, a compact SUV, a compact sedan, a compact hatchback, a B-segment SUV and a compact MPV.

Motors
The T10X is offered in two powertrain configurations, namely an electric motor on the rear axle providing rear-wheel drive (RWD) or dual electric motors on the front and rear axles offering all-wheel drive (AWD). The Rear-Wheel Drive (RWD) configuration with an electric motor delivers 160 kW (215 hp) and 350 N m of torque, enabling 0-100 km/h in 7.6 seconds. For its part, the configuration in all-wheel drive (AWD) with two electric motors develops a power of 320 kW (430 hp) and 700 N m of torque allowing to perform the 0 to 100 km/h in 4.8 seconds.

Autonomy and communications
According to Zorlu the cars will be constantly connected to the internet by 5G.

Safety
The car conforms to the standards of the European New Car Assessment Programme's five-star rating system applicable by 2022. Cars sold in the home market will be speed limited to 180 km/h.

Pricing and competition
The starting price of the T10X in Türkiye of the base model, named V1, is 953,000 ₺. On the other hand, the starting price of the more luxurious model, named V2, with a extended range battery is 1,215,000 ₺.

Production
A factory is being built in Gemlik, with an eventual annual capacity of 175,000 units, mass production vehicles being slated to begin in the final quarter of 2022, with a target of a million vehicles by 2030. On 18 July 2020, ground was broken for the factory on the  site, and construction is planned to take 18 months. When completed, a workforce of over 4,300 will be directly employed in the plant, and about three-quarters of the sourcing will be from within the country.

Batteries
Togg offers two battery options for the T10X which correspond to a choice between a lithium-ion battery with a capacity of 52.4 kWh for a range of 314 km and a consumption of 16.7 kWh/100 km, or a larger lithium-ion battery with a capacity of 88.5 kWh providing a range of 523 km for a consumption of 16.9 kWh/100 km. The T10X has a charging capacity of up to 180 kW with a DC charger, allowing the battery to go from 20% to 80% in 28 minutes. The standard Turkish electrical power socket (which is 230V) will provide a full charge overnight. The batteries are produced at Siro in Gemlik, Bursa province. Siro's facilities are located alongside the Togg plant. Siro is a Togg subsidiary (50% owned) established in partnership with energy company Farasis Energy. Farasis Energy says the cells will last for 1 million kilometres.

Sales
The sale of the T10X started in March 2023 in Turkey and it will be available in the European market towards the end of 2024. The government has guaranteed that it will buy 30,000 vehicles by 2035.

Economics
₺22 billion ($3.21 billion) are slated to be invested and it is hoped the current account deficit of the economy of Turkey will be reduced by US$7.5 billion - much of the deficit is due to energy such as oil imports. The CEO said in 2020 that the economy will benefit by 50 billion euros over 15 years by the direct and indirect increase in employment.

Environment
It is hoped to benefit the environment by reducing air pollution in Turkey and greenhouse gas emissions by Turkey.

References

All-wheel-drive vehicles
Cars introduced in 2019
Cars of Turkey
Compact cars
Rear-wheel-drive vehicles
2020s cars
Economy of Bursa
TOGG
Hatchbacks
Subcompact cars
Electric vehicles